Oral-B is an American brand of oral hygiene products, including toothpastes, toothbrushes, electric toothbrushes, and mouthwashes. The brand has been in business since the invention of the Hutson toothbrush in 1950 and in Redwood City, California.

History 
Dr. Robert W. Hutson (1919–2001), owner of a periodontal practice in San Jose, began designing a toothbrush in the 1940s. By 1949, he discovered that thin, round-ended, nylon filaments would be gentle on the gums yet effective for cleaning teeth. Hutson patented a toothbrush in 1950. The application for a design patent for his "Hutson toothbrush" was filed on January 13, 1950, and U.S. Design Patent No. 160,604 was granted on October 24 the same year. In 1958, he was granted a utility patent for a "mouthbrush" having fine, soft, flat-ended nylon bristles, and a similar appearance to the 1950 design. He claimed in his application that this brush was less abrasive to tooth enamel, better for massaging the gums, and more effective at picking up tooth powder than other brushes available at the time, which had coarse, angle-cut bristles.

The toothbrushes were made by the Owens Brush Company. The partners placed a $10,000 order for brushes and hired the first two sales people. In order to create demand for new brushes, the sales team devoted almost all of their time to communicating with dentists, passing samples and outreach work. The result of these efforts has been a steady increase in the number of orders. The next successful step was the decision to participate in the conventions and conferences of dentists held in the state of California.

He also created the Oral-B brand name. The first product was known as the "Oral-B 60", because it had 60 tufts. Other sizes were made with differing numbers of tufts and corresponding names. Hutson sold his toothbrush business in the 1960s, and continued his San Jose periodontal practice.

Oral-B became part of the Gillette group in 1984. Braun, also part of the Gillette group at that time, started to use the Oral-B brand for electric toothbrushes. Oral-B has been part of the Procter & Gamble company since 2006.
A company representative has stated that the "B" in Oral-B stands for "brush".

In 2013, Colombian singer Shakira was chosen as the brand ambassador and spokesperson for the 3D White property.

Innovations 

 1991: Bristle color fades with wear (Indicator toothbrush, Edison Awards winner)
 1996: IDEO begins design of Oral-B for kids
 1998: Angled bristles (CrossAction toothbrush)
 February 1999: Oral-B CrossAction toothbrush with Criss-Cross bristles for simultaneous brushing in two opposite directions.
 2010: Oral-B Triumph 5000 enters the international market, equipped with touch, sound and light indicators that notify of the need to change the nozzle. The British Dental Health Foundation names the Triumph 5000 as the platinum leader in plaque removal.
 2012: Oral-B Trizone 1000 electric toothbrush with brush head shape and brushing technique similar to a manual brush.
 2014: the first toothbrush with Bluetooth 4.0 Oral-B SmartSeries technology.
 2017: New version of the battery, holds a charge 2 times longer and charges 2 times faster.
 2019: Genius X toothbrush with artificial intelligence.

See also 

 Index of oral health and dental articles
 List of defunct consumer brands
 List of Procter & Gamble brands
 List of toothpaste brands
 Oral-B Glide

References

External links 
 
 oralb.com (1996-12-29)

Oral hygiene
Procter & Gamble brands
Products introduced in 1950
1984 mergers and acquisitions
2005 mergers and acquisitions
Brands of toothpaste